Elisa Gabrielli is an American actress and comedian, who played "Pepper" Potts in the animated movie The Invincible Iron Man, among other roles. Gabrielli also played the part of Miss Linley in The Brady Bunch Movie. In the 2005 animated film Madagascar, she was the voice of Nana, which became a breakout character that she voiced again in the 2008 sequel, Madagascar: Escape 2 Africa.

Filmography

Live acting

Film
Alien Space Avenger (1989) as Red Riding Hood
Naked Gun : The Final Insult (1994) as Mourner
The Brady Bunch Movie (1995) as Miss Lynley
Waiting Game (1996) as Hattie
Bubba and Ike (1998)
Seven Girlfriends (1999) as Joan
Luck of the Draw (2000) as Hit-Man's Woman
Patching Cabbage (2003) as Fight Mother
Father vs. Son (2010) as Beach Couple Wife

Television
Eden (1993) as Celine
Babylon 5 ("Mind War", 1994) as Guest Liaison
Reform School Girl (1994) as Velmont Girl
Murder One (1 episode, 1995) as Reporter
Brooklyn South (1 episode, 1997) as Female Clown
Jenny (1 episode, 1998) as Tammy
ER (1 episode, 1998) as Inga Peterson
G-Spot (1 episode, 2005) as Miramax Female Producer

Voice artist

Video games

Quest for Glory V: Dragon Fire (1998) as Nawar
Robotech: Invasion (2004) as Maria
Warcraft series (2002–present) as Tyrande Whisperwind

Film

Mulan (1998) as Additional Voice
Shrek (2001) as Additional Voices
The Madagascar Penguins in a Christmas Caper (2005) as Old Lady/Nana
Open Season (2006) as Additional Voices
Beverly Hills Chihuahua (2008) as Elderly Chihuahua
Open Season 2 (2008) as Additional Voices
Bride Wars (2009) as Additional Voices
Cyrus (2010) as Additional Voices
From Up on Poppy Hill (2011, English dub) as Additional Voices
Zootopia (2016) as Additional Voices (uncredited)

Television
The Super Dave Superbowl of Knowledge (1994)
3×3 Eyes (1995)
El Hazard: The Magnificent World (1995) as Queen Diva
Gargoyles (2 episodes, 1995–1996) as Obsidiana, Maria Chavez
Battle Athletes (1998) as Check-In Clerk, Upperclassman B, Operator A
Dual! Parallel Trouble Adventure (2000) as Ayuko Rara
The Legend of Black Heaven (2000) as Layla Yuki
W.I.T.C.H. (1 episode, 2006) as Sarina Sanchez
The Spectacular Spider-Man (2 episodes, 2008–2009) as Dr. Ashley Kafka

Additional Dialog Recording
Son in Law (1993)
Iron Will (1994)
While You Were Sleeping (1995)
That Old Feeling (1997)
Romy and Michele's High School Reunion (1997)
The Limey (1999)
Diplomatic Siege (1999)
Meet the Parents (2000)
Winning London (2001)
Shrek (2001)
Monster's Ball (2001)
The Challenge (2003)
House of D (2004)
Shopgirl (2005)
Bobby (2006)
Smart People (2008)
The Experiment (2010)

AudioBooks

References

External links
 
 

Living people
American film actresses
American voice actresses
American video game actresses
Date of birth missing (living people)
Place of birth missing (living people)
Year of birth missing (living people)
21st-century American women